Fujiwara no Toshiyuki (birthdate unknown – 901 or 907, Japanese: 藤原 敏行, also 藤原 敏行 朝臣 Fujiwara Toshiyuki no Ason) was a middle Heian waka poet and Japanese nobleman. He was designated a member of the Thirty-six Poetry Immortals and one of his poems is included in the famous anthology Hyakunin Isshu.

Toshiyuki's poems are included in several imperial poetry anthologies, including Kokin Wakashū and Gosen Wakashū. A personal poetry collection known as the Toshiyukishū also remains.

External links 
E-text of his poems in Japanese

Fujiwara clan
900s deaths
Year of birth unknown
10th-century Japanese poets
Hyakunin Isshu poets
10th-century Japanese calligraphers